Princess Likelike and her siblings King David Kalākaua, Queen Liliʻuokalani, and Crown Prince Leleiohoku II, were known as the Nā Lani ʻEhā (The Royal Four): aliʻi who were renowned as composers and champions of Hawaiian music in the latter half of the 19th century. With Likelike's siblings, she led one of the three royal music clubs that held regular friendly competitions to outdo each other in song and poetry while she was alive.  "ʻĀinahau", the most famed of Likelike's works, was composed about the Cleghorn residence in Waikiki, the gathering place for Sunday afternoon musical get-togethers where she wrote most of her compositions. She encouraged the musical education of her daughter, Princess Kaʻiulani, and sponsored concerts and musical pageants. The patronage she gave to young musicians and composers helped perpetuate Hawaiian music.

ʻĀinahau 
ʻĀinahau, one of the homes of the Oʻahu chiefs, was part of the  estate inherited by Princess Ruth Keʻelikōlani. Originally called Auaukai, Princess Likelike named it ʻĀinahau or "Cool Land" when she lived there with her husband, Archibald Scott Cleghorn, who turned it into a botanical garden. The stream that flowed through ʻĀinahau and emptied into the ocean where the present Outrigger Hotel is located, was called Apuakehau. She wrote a song about her home the "Cool Land".

Lyrics

Maikaʻi Waipiʻo 
Maikaʻi Waipiʻo translated as Beautiful Waipiʻo, was a song dedicated to Queen Emma whose beauty reminded Princess Likelike of Waipiʻo and was the inspiration for the song. In keeping with Hawaiian tradition, the song belonged to the Queen rather than the composer.

Lyrics

Ahe Lau Makani 

Ahe Lau Makani, meaning there is a breath,  was a waltz composed jointly with the Princess's sister Liliʻuokalani and Kapoli Kamakau, a mysterious collaborator who, to this day, remains unidentified.

Kuʻu Ipo I Ka Heʻe Puʻe One 
Kuʻu Ipo I Ka Heʻe Puʻe One translated as My Sweetheart In the Rippling Hills, was a song originally called Ka ʻOwe a ke Kai (The Murmuring of The Sea).  The English translation is by Ruth Leilani Tyau and S. H. Elbert.  Perhaps the most famous of Likelike's compositions, many believe it was written for a heartbroken girl who could not marry the love of her life.

Lyrics

See also 
 List of compositions by Leleiohoku II
 List of compositions by Liliʻuokalani

References 

Hawaiian music
Lists of compositions by composer
Hawaii-related lists